Hans Jost (born 21 April 1922) was a Swiss boxer. He competed in the men's heavyweight event at the 1952 Summer Olympics.

References

External links

1922 births
Possibly living people
Swiss male boxers
Olympic boxers of Switzerland
Boxers at the 1952 Summer Olympics
Place of birth missing
Heavyweight boxers